The Chaudiere-Appalaches Junior AA Hockey League is a junior ice hockey league in the Province of Quebec, Canada.  The league is sanctioned by Hockey Quebec and Hockey Canada.  Its champion competes each Spring for the Coupe Dodge.

History
The CAJAAHL is based in the Chaudière-Appalaches area of Quebec.

The CAJAAHL was formerly known as the Beauce-Bellechase Junior AA League, but changed its name around 2007.  At one point the league was known as the Beauce-Frontenac League.

Teams

Champions
Bolded denotes winner of Coupe Dodge as provincial champions.

2006 Levis Levy Honda
2007 Bellechasse Senateurs
2008 Bellechasse Senateurs
2009 St-Georges Cléri Sport
2010 Bellechasse Senateurs
2011 Levis Levy Honda
2012 Levis Levy Honda
2013 Ste-Marie Beaucerons
2014 Bellechasse Lafontaine
2015 Bellechasse Lafontaine
2016 Levis Levy Honda
2017 Bellechasse Lafontaine
2018 Bellechasse Lafontaine
2019 Bellechasse Lafontaine
2022 Lotbinière Model

External links
CAJAAHL website
Coupe Dodge website

B
B
Hockey Quebec